Pseudohongiella nitratireducens is a Gram-negative, aerobic, rod-shaped and motile bacterium from the genus of Pseudohongiella which has been isolated from seawater from the South China Sea.

References

External links
Type strain of Pseudohongiella nitratireducens at BacDive -  the Bacterial Diversity Metadatabase

Alteromonadales
Bacteria described in 2016